EH domain-containing protein 1, also known as testilin or PAST homolog 1 (PAST1), is a protein that in humans is encoded by the EHD1 gene belonging to the EHD protein family.

Function 

This gene belongs to a highly conserved gene family encoding EPS15 homology (EH) domain-containing proteins. The protein-binding EH domain was first noted in EPS15, a substrate for the epidermal growth factor receptor. The EH domain has been shown to be an important motif in proteins involved in protein-protein interactions and in intracellular sorting. The protein encoded by this gene is thought to play a role in the endocytosis of IGF1 receptors.

Interactions 

EHD1 has been shown to interact with Insulin-like growth factor 1 receptor and SNAP29.

References

Further reading 

EH-domain-containing proteins